The Saxony Apartment Building is a historic apartment building in Cincinnati, Ohio, United States.  Located along Ninth Street in the city's downtown, this five-story brick building includes a distinctive range of architectural details.  Among these elements are brick pilasters and projections, a three-story bay window on each side of the symmetrical main facade, semicircular balconies, and many stone pieces, such as pediments, keystones, and stringcourses.  Due to its location at the intersection of Ninth and Race Streets, the Saxony appears to have two fronts: one onto each street.  Although the Ninth Street facade is larger and more complex, the Race Street facade is nevertheless ornate as well: it features small yet elaborate semicircular balconies with wrought iron railings similar to those of the Ninth Street facade.

Constructed in 1891 according to a design by leading Cincinnati architect Samuel Hannaford, the Saxony Apartment Building was constructed during the last years of Hannaford's practice.  By this time, he had established himself as one of the city's premier architects, due in large part to his responsibility for the grand Cincinnati Music Hall in the 1870s.  Among the distinctive elements of his buildings as a group is the wide range of architectural styles that he employed: his surviving buildings demonstrate at least five different styles, and although the Saxony Apartments include some obvious Queen Anne elements, the building's overall style cannot easily be classified.

On March 3, 1980, the Saxony Apartment Building was listed on the National Register of Historic Places, due to its well-preserved historic architecture.  Three other apartment buildings, along with more than thirty other buildings in the cities of Cincinnati and Wyoming, were listed on the National Register at the same time as part of a multiple property submission of buildings designed by Hannaford in Hamilton County.  Eight months later, the portion of Ninth Street between Vine and Race Streets was added to the Register as the Ninth Street Historic District, and the Saxony Apartments were named one of the district's dozens of contributing properties.

References

Residential buildings completed in 1891
Apartment buildings in Cincinnati
National Register of Historic Places in Cincinnati
Queen Anne architecture in Ohio
Historic district contributing properties in Ohio
Residential buildings on the National Register of Historic Places in Ohio